Dysprosium acetate is a hypothetical salt of dysprosium and acetate. Its proposed chemical formula is Dy(CH3COO)3.

Preparation
Dysprosium acetate can be obtained by treating acetic acid and dysprosium oxide:
 Dy2O3 + 6 CH3COOH → 2 Dy(CH3COO)3 + 3 H2O
Its hydrate, when heated to 150 °C in vacuum, is proposed to yield the anhydrous triacetate.

References

Dysprosium compounds
acetates